Tumul is the name of several rural localities in the Sakha Republic, Russia: 

Tumul, Khangalassky District, Sakha Republic, a selo in Tumulsky Rural Okrug of Khangalassky District
Tumul, Megino-Kangalassky District, Sakha Republic, a selo in Dollunsky Rural Okrug of Megino-Kangalassky District
Tumul, Namsky District, Sakha Republic, a selo in Modutsky Rural Okrug of Namsky District
Tumul, Suntarsky District, Sakha Republic, a selo in Kutaninsky Rural Okrug of Suntarsky District
Tumul, Ust-Aldansky District, Sakha Republic, a selo in Borogonsky Rural Okrug of Ust-Aldansky District
Tumul, Ust-Maysky District, Sakha Republic, a selo in Kyupsky Natsionalny Rural Okrug of Ust-Maysky District